Michael Bustamante (born September 21, 1989) is a Colombian retired footballer. He is also the former head coach of Boston City FC in the National Premier Soccer League.

Career

Youth and college
Bustamante played college soccer at Boston University between 2008 and 2012. In four seasons with the Terriers, Bustamante appeared in 69 matches and scored 9 goals and recorded 27 assists. During his time at college, he also played for USL PDL club Worcester Hydra during their 2012 season.

Professional
Bustamante was drafted in the first round (13th overall) of the 2013 MLS Supplemental Draft by New York Red Bulls. He signed a developmental contract with the club on February 22, 2013. He then made his official debut for New York on May 29, 2013 starting in central midfield in a 2–0 US Open Cup victory over Reading United. He made his Major League Soccer debut as a late substitute during a 4–0 win against Montreal Impact on July 13, 2013.

Bustamante was waived by the Red Bulls on March 21, 2015. He signed with United Soccer League club Charlotte Independence on July 30, 2015.

Bustamante made his debut with Boston City FC on May 1, 2016 in a game against the New York Cosmos. He was named to the All-NPSL team in his first season. Bustamante was named head coach of Boston City FC on March 14, 2019. On May 26, 2019 in a game against the Greater Lowell Rough Diamonds, Bustamante received a red card in this 85th minute of the game and was suspended for six games plus an additional six months for the incident. He was released from the team on June 7, 2019.

Honours

Club
New York Red Bulls
MLS Supporters' Shield: 2013

Boston City FC

 All-NPSL Team: 2016

Career statistics

References

External links

Boston bio

1989 births
Living people
Association football midfielders
Boston University Terriers men's soccer players
Charlotte Independence players
Colombian footballers
Colombian expatriate footballers
Colombian expatriate sportspeople in the United States
Expatriate soccer players in the United States
Major League Soccer players
New York Red Bulls draft picks
New York Red Bulls players
Soccer players from Massachusetts
Sportspeople from Chelsea, Massachusetts
USL Championship players
USL League Two players
Worcester Hydra players
Footballers from Medellín